There was a blast in Indian city Agra on 17 September 2011 around 5:45 PM, at Jai Hospital, At least 15 people were injured and no fatalities were reported.

Uttar Pradesh DGP and chief secretary to the Union home ministry said that due to the edge competition between two private hospitals the blast might have happened.

References

Terrorist incidents in India in 2011
History of Agra
Improvised explosive device bombings in India
Terrorist incidents in Uttar Pradesh
Attacks on hospitals
Building bombings in India